Scott Alexander van Breda (born 12 December 1991) is a South African rugby union player for RFU Championship side Jersey Reds. He is a utility back, that can play as centre, full-back or winger.

Career

Early career

He made just four appearances in the 2012 Under-21 Provincial Championship, but scored 90 points to once again finish as his team's top scorer and just three points behind the top scorer in Group B, s' Chris Willemse. He missed the semi-final, but returned to play for them in the final, where he kicked nine points to help his side win the competition by beating the s 24–10.

Eastern Province Kings / Southern Kings

He also kicked six penalties during the season for a tally of 38 points, the second-highest for the Kings behind first-choice kicker Justin van Staden.

After making a further first class appearance against a South African Students side, Van Breda played in his first Currie Cup campaign.

2013 saw the ' debut in the Super Rugby tournament. Van Breda was initially named in the Kings' wider training squad for the 2013 Super Rugby season, but was subsequently released to their Vodacom Cup squad. He came on as a late substitute in the match to make his Super Rugby debut.

With the Kings' first-choice fly-half Demetri Catrakilis ruled out of the second leg of the play-off through injury, Van Breda was included in the run-on side and took over the kicking duties.

Van Breda played a key role for the  during the 2013 Currie Cup First Division, starting 13 of their 16 matches and scoring 146 points, the third highest in the competition. This helped them to second place in the log and a spot in the end-of-season play-offs.

Along with fullback Siviwe Soyizwapi, Van Breda was included in the  squad prior to the 2014 Super Rugby season, but he returned to Port Elizabeth without playing any matches.

Van Breda made just one appearance during the 2014 Vodacom Cup in their match against Kenyan side  as he was part of a group concentrating on conditioning prior to their Currie Cup Premier Division campaign. In June 2014, he was selected in the starting line-up for the  side to face  during a tour match during a 2014 incoming tour. He played the entire match as the Kings suffered a 12–34 defeat. He made his debut in the Premier Division of the Currie Cup on the opening day of the season against  and played in a total of eight matches, finishing the season as the Kings' top scorer with 44 points.

He made his 50th appearance for the EP Kings by playing off the bench in their first match of the 2015 Vodacom Cup season, a 19–27 defeat to defending champions .

Jersey Reds
On 14 July 2017, Van Breda signed for English club Jersey Reds, who compete in the RFU Championship ahead of the 2017-18 season.

Worcester Warriors
On 22 February 2018, Premiership side Worcester Warriors announced the signing of Van Breda for the 2018-19 season.

Return to Jersey Reds
Van Breda returned to Jersey Reds on a short-term loan deal for the remainder of the season in March 2021 during the 2020–21 season. However, on 27 May 2021, van Breda would sign a new deal to re-join Jersey Reds on a permanent basis for the 2021-22 season, where he was named new club captain over the summer.

References

South African rugby union players
Eastern Province Elephants players
Worcester Warriors players
Living people
1991 births
Jersey Reds players
Stormers players
Western Province (rugby union) players
Southern Kings players
Rugby union fullbacks
South African expatriate sportspeople in Jersey
South African expatriate sportspeople in England
South African expatriate rugby union players
Expatriate rugby union players in Jersey
Expatriate rugby union players in England